William G. Tanner (10 March 1930 – 10 June 2007) was a Southern Baptist pastor, educator, administrator, and denominational leader. 

He was married to Ellen Yates Tanner. They had four children: William Tanner, Jr., Keith Tanner, Mark Kyle Tanner, and Kimberley Tanner Canova.

Education
 Bryan High School, Bryan, Texas, 1947
 English and Religion, Baylor University, 1951
 Master's of Administration, University of Houston, 1953
 Doctorate in Administration and Guidance, University of Houston, 1956. 
 Bachelor of Divinity, Southwestern Baptist Theological Seminary, 1958
 Doctor of Theology, Southwestern Baptist Theological Seminary, 1967

OBU President
During Tanner's presidency, Oklahoma Baptist University's enrollment grew from less than 1,600 to a university record of 1,818 in 1975. The university's budget grew from $3.6 million to $5.2 million. He also oversaw the Mabee Learning Center capital project garner $1.8 million in gifts and contributions. He resigned as president of OBU to become president of the Home Mission Board of the Southern Baptist Convention (now the North American Mission Board). 

1930 births
2007 deaths
Baylor University alumni
University of Houston alumni
Southwestern Baptist Theological Seminary alumni
Presidents of Oklahoma Baptist University
Christian writers
Southern Baptist ministers
20th-century Baptist ministers from the United States
20th-century American academics